Rrafshi ("plateau" in Albanian) may refer to:

Metohija (Rrafshi i Dukagjinit), region in Kosovo
Llap (region) or Rrafshi i Llapit, region in Kosovo
Kosovo (region) (Rrafshi i Kosovës), region in Kosovo

References

Albanian place names